Aironi Rugby ("herons") was an Italian professional rugby union team competing in the Pro12 and the Heineken Cup, representing the Italian regions of Lombardy and Emilia-Romagna. It lost its status as a regional side at the end of the 2011–12 season, as the Italian Rugby Federation revoked its licence for financial reasons. They were replaced by Zebre from the 2012–13 season.

Home ground 
The team played in Viadana at Stadio Luigi Zaffanella. It was expected that Reggio Emilia's Stadio Giglio would be used for larger games but no games required its near 30,000 capacity.

Kit 
The team's primary kit was all black with a silver stripe. Their alternative kit was white with a silver stripe. In the Heineken Cup the players wore an all green kit. Their kit was supplied by Adidas.

Member clubs 
The formation of the team was made possible by the co-operation of eight existing rugby clubs Rugby Viadana 54%, Colorno 15%, Gran Parma Rugby 10%, Rugby Parma 10%, Noceto 5%, Reggio Emilia 2%, Modena 2% and Mantova 2%. Gran Parma, Rugby Viadana and Colorno have merged as a result of the formation of Aironi to form GranDucato Rugby Parma. Rugby Parma and Noceto have merged to form Crociati (Crusaders) Rugby Parma. These mergers were essential as the Super 10 (now Top12) division would have attracted far less sponsorship.

History
After several failed attempts, there was doubt that a deal for Italian entry into the Celtic League would be completed in time for the 2010–11 season, with the Scots delaying support for entry until changes were made to the Celtic League management structure. In February 2010 it was announced that the planned expansion of the Celtic League was to be pust on hold. The reasons were the insistence by existing members that the Italian teams could be ejected after three years. Also the financial demands the league placed on the Italians could not be met. The existing teams said this was to cover the need to have larger squads to cover the extra fixtures and additional travel expenses. Agreement was reached in early March 2010 to allow Italian teams entry to the Celtic League in time for the 2010–11 season. The clubs would also be guaranteed places annually into the Heineken Cup that had previously been awarded to the two top teams in the National Championship of Excellence.

Italy had failed to make an impact in the Six Nations Championship tournament since joining 10 years earlier. This was largely blamed on the fact their best players did not have a competitive enough domestic tournament or were forced to play abroad. The fact that the Six Nations decider in 2009 between Wales and Ireland featured 42 Celtic League players out of 44 in their squads supported this notion. Most Italian players played in France's Top 14. In order to ensure the new teams delivered players for the national side the Federazione Italiana Rugby put incentives in place for the new teams. The successful franchises would receive financial support from the FIR to recruit national team players at the time playing abroad and fresh home-grown talent. Signing one of Italy's top players, most of whom play abroad, would net clubs €50,000, while other lesser players, mostly plying their trade in the Italian Super 10 series (Italy's top flight league at the time), would scoop €30,000 and €20,000 bonuses.

It was proposed initially that Aironi would join along with a new team Praetorians Roma, but Benetton Treviso were nominated instead of Roma. Treviso and Duchi Nord-Ovest could not agree to form one club to represent the Veneto region and lost out in the first round of bidding despite the region being the traditional home of Italian rugby. However Roma failed to satisfy the evaluators of their financial muscle and Treviso were nominated in their stead. This was boosted by Treviso's defeat of USA Perpignan in the Heineken Cup. Roma were to be based at the Stadio Flaminio in Rome, where Six Nations matches had been staged.

2010–11 Debut Season
Aironi had a very difficult debut season. They initially struggled to compete in the Celtic League. Their coach, Franco Bernini, was sacked in November after a run of disappointing losses. They suffered a number of heavy defeats but often when they did lose (particularly at home) they did so by a single score. This is evidenced by the 8 Losing Bonus points received in 22 games. They finally registered their first win against French team Biarritz in December in the Heineken Cup. This was a massive shock as Biarritz had contested the previous year's final. Their first Celtic League win came at home against Connacht on 26 March, which they won 25–13. They finished bottom of the league in 12th.

Squad

Players in bold capped internationally.
Players with the symbol * are qualified to play for Italy on residency or dual nationality so not counted as a Non-Italian player in squad.
Notes:
Players in Italic joined in the winter.

Magners League

2010–11 Heineken Cup pool stage - Pool 4

2011–12 Final Season

Aironi again struggled in the Pro12 league and finished last. However they did record four victories, including a notable home win over defending champions Munster and eventual Heineken Cup Semi-finalists Edinburgh. In a very tough Heineken Cup group they failed to record any win, or even a losing bonus point. In March Aironi announced they were in financial difficulty. The FIR decided to withdraw their licence for the upcoming season, the death knell for Aironi.

Viadana, the primary club behind Aironi applied to take the vacant place in the Pro12 but this was rejected by the FIR. In June 2012 it was announced that the new franchise would be known as Zebre, which would be based in Parma and be built around Italian players.

Squad 2011–12 - Final Season

**World Cup Cover

Transfers

Players Out 2012–2013
 Alberto de Marchi to  Benetton Treviso
 Giulio Toniolatti to  Benetton Treviso
 Carlo Del Fava to  Newcastle
 Lorenzo Romano to  Saracens
 Fabio Staibano to  Wasps
 George Biagi to  Bristol
 Joshua Furno to  Narbonne
 Nick Williams to  Ulster
 Frans Viljoen to 
Matías Agüero to  Zebre
Andrea de Marchi to  Zebre
Salvatore Perugini to  Zebre
Tommaso D'Apice to  Gloucester
Antonio Denti to  Zebre
Marco Bortolami to  Zebre
Quintin Geldenhuys to  Zebre
Nicola Cattina to  Zebre
Filippo Ferrarini to  Zebre
Tito Tebaldi to  Zebre
Luciano Orquera to  Zebre
Gilberto Pavan to  Zebre
Matteo Pratichetti to  Zebre
Roberto Quartaroli to  Zebre
Giovanbattista Venditti to  Zebre
Alberto Benettin to  Zebre
Paolo Buso to  Zebre
Ruggero Trevisan to  Zebre
Naas Olivier to

References

External links
Rugby Viadana site
Aironi site
Aironi Rugby official facebook page
Aironi Rugby official photo album

 
United Rugby Championship teams
Italian rugby union teams
Rugby clubs established in 2010
Sports clubs disestablished in 2012
Sport in Lombardy